Rooney were a British DIY lo-fi band that released three EPs and three albums between 1997 and 2000, notably the debut album Time on Their Hands which received much support from John Peel. Initially a solo project by Paul Rooney, an artist and musician, the project became a gigging band when Colin Cromer and Ian S Jackson joined in 1999 prior to the band's first and only John Peel session that year. The project ended in 2002 when Paul Rooney decided to focus on other performance projects and gallery works. 

Rooney were musically reminiscent of lo-fi contemporaries such as Arab Strap, Casiotone for the Painfully Alone, and Spare Snare, earlier bands like Sebadoh and (early) Pavement, along with northern English post-punk (particularly Half Man Half Biscuit and The Fall).

History 

Artist Paul Rooney recorded the first Rooney EP (this is not the US band of the same name), Got Up Late, in October 1997 in Newcastle-under-Lyme, using a mini-disc four-track recorder with Paul Rooney on all instruments and vocals. Initially only five copies were self-released on Common Culture Records. The lo-fi music incorporated sometimes humorous — but often unsettling — spoken-sung lyrics describing everyday, mundane activities and observations, an approach which was consistent across all Rooney releases. BBC Radio 1's John Peel and BBC Radio Merseyside's Roger Hill played tracks from the record, and from the subsequent EP Different Kinds of Road Signs.

The debut album Time on Their Hands, released September 1998, was distributed by Cargo Records (UK), and featured the tracks Went to Town, Into The Lens, Throw Away, Touts, Scratched, Walked Round The Estate, and Fountainbridge amongst others. The writer Michael Bracewell described the album thus: '... [encountering] Time on Their Hands, 1998, by the group Rooney, the listener might be reminded of any and all of the following: Patrik Fitzgerald's dour requiem to hope, Tonight, the later songs of Ivor Cutler, the Intense Emotion Society of middle period Dexy's Midnight Runners, the industrial melancholy of Throbbing Gristle's Twenty Jazz Funk Greats and the ambiguous intellectualism of The Television Personalities, notably their re-issue, ...And Don't the Kids Just Love It.' The album was widely and favourably reviewed, including notices by Stewart Lee in The Sunday Times, Tom Ridge of The Wire and Gary Valentine of Mojo magazine. The continued support of John Peel earned a place for Went to Town at number 44 in John Peel's Festive Fifty of 1998, and a Rooney Peel session in 1999. The album received extensive airplay, including BBC Radio 3's Mixing It.

By 1999 Rooney had become a band with new members Colin Cromer and Half Man Half Biscuit/Jegsy Dodd and the Sons of Harry Cross ex-member Ian S Jackson (some of the final performances included Paul Rafferty, who was later a member of Hot Club de Paris), and were operating out of Liverpool, intermittently gigging at venues such as The Dublin Castle, London, and The Briton's Protection, Manchester. As well as conventional gigs the band appeared in events at art venues — Ormeau Baths, Belfast; Grizedale Arts, Cumbria; the My Eye Hurts project at Green Room, Manchester and Thread Waxing Space, New York. The second Rooney album On Fading Out was released in 1999, and the project ostensibly ended with the third and final album, On the Closed Circuit, in November 2000, though gigs continued sporadically until late 2002.

In the years that followed Paul Rooney concentrated on artworks, however he also undertook a series of collaborative 'variety' performances, and toured a rock opera – with various performers – but this time as The NWRA House Band. He referred to the history (real and fictionalized) of the band Rooney in a number of his artworks and stories, references which usually centred on singer Dermot Bucknall from the pre-1997 period of the band. In 2006 comedian and writer Stewart Lee curated the Rooney track Into the Lens for the CD/book The Topography of Chance, which also included Mark E Smith, Derek Bailey and Simon Munnery. In 2014 the three Rooney albums were made available digitally on iTunes, Spotify and other streaming platforms, and the Rooney Peel session was repeated in 2016 on Gideon Coe's BBC 6 Music show. An EP of the session, entitled This Job's Forever - The Peel Session, was later released on Owd Scat Records in 2020.

References 

Musical groups from Liverpool
Musical groups established in 1997